St. Xavier's University, Kolkata'' is a Jesuit university located in New Town, Kolkata, India. It was established on 8 February 2017 as per the notification of the Government of West Bengal, and inaugurated on 7 July 2017.

 History 

In 2011, the St. Xavier's College, Kolkata Alumni Association under its president, John Felix Raj, the principal of the college, devised Vision 2020, a ten-year plan which included the founding of St. Xavier's University, Kolkata. In 2012 the Chief Minister of West Bengal, Mamata Banerjee invited St. Xavier's College to open a university. Land was purchased from the government in 2013 and the foundation stone was laid by Mamata Banerjee in December that year. The West Bengal Assembly unanimously approved of the opening of the university on 8 February 2017 and the Governor gave his assent to the university, on 16 January 2017.

It was established on 8 February 2017 as per the notification of the Government of West Bengal  and inaugurated on 7 July 2017 by Mamata Banerjee, the Chief Minister of West Bengal in the presence of Lakshmi Mittal, an Indian Steel Magnate and the CEO of ArcelorMittal. The same month, Felix Raj took charge of the university as its first vice-chancellor.

By the St. Xavier's University, Kolkata, Act 2016 of the Bengal Assembly, the university may have constituent Jesuit Colleges situated in West Bengal. St. Xavier's College Kolkata Educational Trust is the sponsoring Trust of the university, with the Jesuit provincial as its president and Raj as secretary. Also established were the governing board, executive council, academic council, faculty councils, boards of studies and finance committee.

 Departments Faculty of Arts and Social Studies Department of Economics (BA & MA)
 Department of English (BA & MA)
 Department of Mass Communication (BA & MA)
 Department of Psychology (BA & MA)
 Department of Social work (MSW)Faculty of Commerce and Management Bachelor in Management Studies (BMS)
 B.Com (Morning & Day Section)
 M.Com (Morning Section)Faculty of Science Department of Statistics (M.Sc.) Specialisation in Industrial Statistics/ Business Analytics / Biostatistics.
 Department of Computer Science (M. Sc.) Specialisation in Networking and Cybersecurity / Data Analytics.Xavier Business School (MBA) Specialisation in Finance, Marketing, HR and Business AnalyticsXavier Law School 5 Year Integrated B.A. LLB
 5 Year Integrated B. Com LLBPh.D. Programmes'''
 Commerce
 English
 Economics
 Mass-Communication
 Management

Controversy
The university allegedly forced a female professor to quit and asked her to pay ₹99 crores after she shared pictures in a two-piece swimsuit on her personal social media account. According to the professor, "The vice-chancellor John Felix Raj said this parent had found his son looking at my photographs on Instagram where I was wearing just my undergarments. He said they were sexually explicit and requested the university to save his son from such vulgarity." The professor explained that the photos were posted on 13 June 2021, prior to her joining the university faculty and before she accepted any requests from her students to follow her account which is private. She took the photos as selfies and posted them as an Instagram story which disappeared after 24 hours, so she accused the university panel of gaslighting her.

See also 
 St. Xavier's College, Kolkata
 List of Jesuit sites

References

External links 
 

Universities in Kolkata
Educational institutions established in 2017
2017 establishments in West Bengal
Private universities in India